The Essence of Maynard Ferguson is the third compilation album by Canadian jazz trumpeter Maynard Ferguson on Columbia Records. It was released in 1993 as part of Columbia/Legacy's budget line I Like Jazz series (often sporting Sony's "Nice Price" stickers at retail). At the time of its release, this was the only Compact disc available containing many of Maynard's recordings for Columbia.

Critical reception 

AllMusic's Matt Collar stated simply – "A single-disc, budget-line compilation, The Essence of Maynard Ferguson brings together a handful of tracks the legendary high-note trumpeter recorded during the 1970s."

Track listing 

 Times shown are the correct lengths.

Personnel

Compilation 

 Producer: Nedra Olds-Neal
 Digital Remaster: Mark Wilder, Sony Music Studios, New York
 Product Manager: Penny Armstrong
 Packaging Coordinator: Gina Campanaro
 Art Direction: Allen Weinberg
 Graphic Artist: Kim Gaucher

Notes

References 

1993 albums
Columbia Records albums
Maynard Ferguson albums